An āyah is a "verse" in the Quran, one of the statements of varying length that make up the chapters (surah) of the Quran and are marked by a number. In the Quranic context the word means "evidence", "sign" or "miracle", and in Islam may refer to things other than Quranic verses, such as religious obligations (āyat taklīfiyyah) or cosmic phenomena (āyat takwīniyyah). In the Quran it is referred to in several verses such as:

Overview of the meaning
Although meaning "verse" when using the Quran, it is doubtful whether āyah means anything other than "sign", "proof", or "remarkable event" in the Quran's text. The "signs" refer to various phenomena, ranging from the universe, its creation, the alternation between day and night, rainfall, and the life and growth of plants. Other references are to miracles or to the rewards of belief and the fate of unbelievers. For example:
The Most Heart Touching Recitation Of Surah Baqarah Ayat 286

 "And of his signs is the creation of the heavens and earth and what He has dispersed throughout them of creatures." (Q42:29)
 "And a sign for them is the dead earth. We have brought it to life and brought forth from it grain, and from it, they eat." (Q36:33)
 "... and they denied him; therefore we destroyed them. Herein is indeed a sign yet most of them are not believers." (Q26:139)
 "... you are but a mortal like us. So bring some sign if you are of the truthful." (Q26:154)

Chapters (Surah) in the Quran consist of several verses, varying in number from 3 to 286. Within a long chapter, the verses may be further grouped into thematic sequences or passages.

For the purpose of interpretation, the verses are separated into two groups: those that are clear and unambiguous (muhkam) and those that are ambiguous (mutashabeh). This distinction is based on the Quran itself: "It is God Who has sent down to you the Book. In it are verses that are 'clear', they are the foundation of the Book. Others are 'allegorical' but those in whose hearts is perversity follow the part thereof that is allegorical, seeking discord, and searching for its hidden meanings, but no one knows its hidden meanings except God. And those who are firmly grounded in knowledge say: We believe in the Book, the whole of it is from our Lord. And none will grasp the Message except men of understanding."

A common perception and/or saying is that the number of verses in the Quran is 6,666. In fact, the total number of verses in the Quran is 6,236 excluding Bismillah and 6348 including Bismillah. (There are 114 chapters in the Quran, however there are only 112 unnumbered Bismillah's because Surah At-Tawbah does not have one at the beginning and even though the one at the beginning of Surah Al-Fatiha is its first verse hence part of it), there is another Bismillah in the middle of āyah 30 of Surah An-Naml .

The Unicode symbols for a Quran verse, including U+06DD (۝), and U+08E2 (࣢).

The first āyah in the Quran from a chronological order is Read [O Muhammad!] in the name of your Lord who created (Q96:1) from surah Al-Alaq. The first āyah from a traditional order is In the name of God, the Compassionate Merciful One from surah Al-Fatiha. The first ayahs after the opening surah are Aleph-lamed-mem. This is the Scripture whereof there is no doubt, a guidance for the God-fearing, from surah Al-Baqara.

See also
 Ayatollah
 Quranism
The Most Heart Touching Recitation Of Surah Baqarah ayat 286

References

Notes

Citations

 
Components of the Quran
Islamic terminology